Noé Achille Kwin Amban (born 14 January 1990), commonly known as Noé Kwin, is a Cameroonian football defender.

Early career

He started playing with Jeunesse de Bonamoussadi. Then he played with Coton Sport since 2010 and has won the Elite One in 2010–11.  In the winter break of the 2012–13 season he joined Serbian side FK Spartak Subotica. He failed to make any appearance in the Serbian SuperLiga and he got released in late March 2013.

DAC Dunajská Streda
In summer 2013 he joined Slovak side DAC Dunajská Streda and he made his debut in a Corgoň Liga match against Košice on September 14, 2013.

Honours
Cotonspor
Elite One: 2010–11

References

External links

1990 births
Living people
Footballers from Douala
Cameroonian footballers
Association football midfielders
Coton Sport FC de Garoua players
FK Spartak Subotica players
FC DAC 1904 Dunajská Streda players
FC ViOn Zlaté Moravce players
Slovak Super Liga players
Cameroonian expatriate footballers
Expatriate footballers in Serbia
Expatriate footballers in Slovakia
Cameroonian expatriate sportspeople in Serbia
Cameroonian expatriate sportspeople in Slovakia